Starzyński (feminine: Starzyńska, plural form: Starzyńscy ) is a Polish surname. Notable people with the surname include:
Filip Starzyński (born 1991), Polish footballer
Stefan Starzyński (1893–1939), Polish statesman, economist and military officer 
Wacław Starzyński (1910–1976), Polish cyclist 

Polish-language surnames